The 2021–22 North Dakota State Bison men's basketball team represented North Dakota State University in the 2021–22 NCAA Division I men's basketball season. The Bison, led by eighth-year head coach David Richman, played their home games at the Scheels Center in Fargo, North Dakota, as members of the Summit League.
The Bison went into the Summit League tournament as the number 2 seed. They beat Denver and Oral Roberts before falling to South Dakota State in the championship game.

Previous season
The Bison finished the 2020–21 season 15–12, 11–5 in Summit League play to finish in third place. In the Summit League tournament, they defeated Kansas City in the quarterfinals, South Dakota in the semifinals, before falling to Oral Roberts in the championship game.

Roster

Offseason

Departures

Incoming Transfers

Recruiting Class

2021 Recruiting Class

Schedule and results

|-
!colspan=12 style=| Exhibition

|-
!colspan=12 style=| Non-conference regular season

|-
!colspan=9 style=| Summit League regular season

|-
!colspan=9 style=|Summit League tournament

Sources

Season Honors

First-Team All-Summit League
Rocky Kreuser
Sam Griesel
Reference:

Summit League All-Defensive Team
Tyree Eady

Summit League All-Tournament Team
Sam Griesel
Grant Nelson
Reference:

References

North Dakota State Bison men's basketball seasons
North Dakota State Bison
North Dakota State Bison men's basketball
North Dakota State Bison men's basketball